Édgar Felipe "Pipe" Pardo Castro (born 17 August 1990) is a Colombian professional footballer who plays as a winger for Categoría Primera A club Independiente Medellín.

Club career

Early years
Pardo began his professional career with Atlético Huila in 2007 before being loaned out to Deportivo Cali for the first half of the 2009 season. He scored his first goal with Deportivo Cali against Independiente Medellín in a 3–1 league win. In July 2009, he was loaned out to Independiente Medellin. In December, he was part of the squad that won the 2009 Finalizacion tournament, and the club signed him on a three year contract a few days after winning the title. In March 2013, he left the club after almost four years.

Braga
On 16 April 2013, Pardo joined Braga for an approximated €600,000 transfer fee signing a four-year contract. He completed his first season in Portugal's top flight, the Primeira Liga, with 9 goals and 5 assists in 41 appearances, establishing himself as a dependable option on the right flank of the attack. He finished the 2014–15 season 34 appearances, scoring 10 goals and making 9 assists.

Olympiacos
Various clubs made an attempt to sign him, but Olympiacos's offer and the opportunity to play in the Champions League brought him at Karaiskaki Stadium. Marco Silva, his ex-coach and the new coach of Olympiacos is a big admirer of Pardo. On 17 July 2015, after two years of exceptional football in Portuguese Primeira Liga, he signed for Olympiacos for a fee of €4.5 million. The transfer was announced on Olympiacos' website on 18 July.

On 16 September 2015, Pardo made his debut in Champions League, playing in a 3–0 home defeat against Bayern Munich. On 29 September, he contributed to a shock 3–2 away win against Arsenal in the Champions League, scoring the opener and assisting Alfreð Finnbogason to seal the win.
On 4 November, Olympiacos were on the verge of reaching the Champions League round of 16 after he came off the bench to inspire a comeback victory against Dinamo Zagreb in Piraeus, scoring twice with the second goal coming in the 90th minute. His performance earned him a place among the Champions League team of the week. Five days later, Pardo played the full 90 minutes as Arsenal beat Olympiacos 3–0 in Piraeus, progressing into the Champions League knockout stages at the expense of the Greek club. On 3 January 2016, he scored his first goal in Greek Super League, coming on as a substitute in the second half and assisting Brown Ideye for the winning goal, helping his club to a 3–1 away win against Panionios and being named "Man of the Match".

Nantes (loan)
On 11 January 2017, Pardo joined Nantes on loan for the second half of the season.

Back to Olympiacos
In the summer of 2017 Pardo returned to Olympiacos. On the last day of the summer transfer window, Argentinian club Independiente came with a new proposal for Felipe Pardo, but Olympiacos responded negatively. The Argentinian club was keenly interested in the Colombian winger, but Olympiakos responded negatively to Independiente's offer of €2.6 million with a resale rate for the "Reds" of 20%, as coach Besnik Hasi desired to maintain the player in the team roster.

On 12 September 2017, he scored twice having come on as a substitute in a 3–2 Champions League Group stage loss against Sporting Lisbon at the Karaiskakis Stadium, becoming only the fourth player in Champions League history to score a brace in the same match coming off the bench. On 5 November, he scored a brace in a 5–1 home Super League win against Platanias.

Toluca 
On 2 January 2019, Pardo left Olympiacos after three and a half years and 77 caps, 15 goals, 13 assists in all competitions and joined Deportivo Toluca of Liga MX.

Independiente Medellín

On 1 January 2022, he returned to his first club as a professional, Independiente Medellín. He scored his first goal on 25 January during a 1–0 victory at home to Deportes Tolima in the league's first matchday.

International career
Pardo played with the Colombia national u-17 team at the 2007 FIFA U-17 World Cup, scoring once in a 5–0 win against Trinidad and Tobago.

On 7 November 2015 Pardo's performances for Olympiacos led to his first call up to the Colombia national team for the qualifying games for the 2018 FIFA World Cup qualification. On 14 November 2017, he scored his first goal for the national team, opening the scoring in a 4–0 friendly victory against China.

International goals
Scores and results list Colombia's goal tally first.

Personal life
Pardo is known by the nickname Pipe, which is short for Felipe.

Honours

Club
Independiente Medellín
Categoría Primera A: 2009 Clausura

Braga
Taça de Portugal runner-up: 2014–15

Olympiacos
Super League Greece: 2015–16
Greek Cup runner-up: 2015–16

References

External links

1990 births
Living people
People from Quibdó
Association football wingers
Association football forwards
Colombian footballers
Colombia international footballers
Categoría Primera A players
Primeira Liga players
Super League Greece players
Ligue 1 players
Atlético Huila footballers
Deportivo Cali footballers
Independiente Medellín footballers
S.C. Braga players
Olympiacos F.C. players
FC Nantes players
Colombian expatriate footballers
Colombian expatriate sportspeople in Portugal
Colombian expatriate sportspeople in Greece
Colombian expatriate sportspeople in France
Expatriate footballers in Portugal
Expatriate footballers in Greece
Expatriate footballers in France
Deportivo Toluca F.C. players
Liga MX players
Sportspeople from Chocó Department